Nursing Outlook is a bimonthly peer-reviewed nursing journal covering nursing practice, education, and research. It is published by Elsevier. The journal was established in 1994, with as its founding editor-in-chief Carole A. Anderson. It is the official journal of the American Academy of Nursing and its current editor-in-chief is Marion E. Broome (Duke University).

Abstracting and indexing
The journal is abstracted and indexed in Scopus and CINAHL. According to the Journal Citation Reports, the journal has a 2017 impact factor of 2.425.

References

External links

General nursing journals
Elsevier academic journals
Bimonthly journals
Publications with year of establishment missing
English-language journals